The 2021 African Handball Cup Winners' Cup was the 26th edition, organized by the African Handball Confederation, under the auspices of the International Handball Federation, the handball sport governing body. The tournament was held from 24 August till 2 September 2021 and took place in Meknes, Morocco, contested by 8 teams and won by Al Ahly SC of Egypt.

Draw

Preliminary rounds

Group A

* Note:  Advance to quarter-finals

Group B

* Note:  Advance to quarter-finals

Championship bracket

Final standings

Awards

References 

37TH MEN'S AND WOMEN'S AFRICAN CLUB CUP WINNERS CHAMPIONSHIPS

African Handball Cup Winners' Cup
2021 in African handball
International handball competitions hosted by Morocco